Danny Danko (born Daniel Vinkovetsky on  July 4, 1972) is a writer, marijuana enthusiast and former Senior Cultivation Editor of High Times magazine.

Early life
He was born in Leningrad, USSR.

Career
Danko is the author of the 2011 book, The Official High Times Field Guide to Marijuana Strains, and the book, A Beginner's Guide to Growing Marijuana.

As a marijuana expert, Danko has appeared on National Public Radio's program, All Things Considered, was featured in a New York Times article, received coverage in Vice, featured in a CNBC report,  multiple times. Danko has been featured in Slate, the Wall Street Journal, was mentioned in the Los Angeles Times, He has received coverage in the Washington Post.

Northeast Leaf
Danko left High Times magazine in April 2020 due to COVID-19 layoffs. In July 2020, Danko was one of four former High Times senior staffers to launch Northeast Leaf, a free monthly print magazine focused on the growing cannabis communities and businesses in the Northeast.

Interviews
Danko has been interviewed in the Detroit Metro Times., and by The Nation.

References

External links
Danny Danko at High Times

Living people
American magazine writers
American cannabis activists
Cannabis cultivation
1972 births